Zouheir Shourbagi was the first ever representative from Syria to compete at the Olympics when he went to the 1948 Summer Olympic Games held in London. He competed at diving, where he placed tenth in the finals. After the end of his competitive career, Shourbagi became the director of the Syrian Supreme Life Saving Committee in 1958, where he organized swimming and lifesaving courses for Syrian firemen, policemen, and soldiers.

References

External links

Divers at the 1948 Summer Olympics
Olympic divers of Syria
Year of birth missing
Possibly living people
Syrian male divers